Minnesota State Highway 74 (MN 74) is a  highway in southeast Minnesota that runs from its intersection with U.S. Highway 52 and State Highway 30 in Chatfield and continues north to its northern terminus at its intersection with U.S. Highway 61 at Weaver along the Mississippi River. It is the only remaining road in the state highway system that is still partially unpaved.

Route description
State Highway 74 serves as a north–south route in southeast Minnesota between Chatfield, St. Charles, Elba, and Weaver. It is legally defined as Legislative Route 74 in the Minnesota Statutes.

Highway 74 begins at its intersection with U.S. 52 and State Highway 30 in Chatfield and continues north through the unincorporated communities of Troy and Saratoga.  Highway 74 has a junction with Interstate 90 just south of St. Charles.  In St. Charles, Highway 74 becomes Main Street, also known as Whitewater Avenue, until it joins U.S. Highway 14 briefly. Highway 74 runs concurrent west with Highway 14 for less than a mile. The route continues north again, passing through Whitewater State Park and the town of Elba. The highway ends at its junction with U.S. Highway 61 in Weaver, Minnesota. About  of the northern end of the route through the Whitewater Wildlife Management Area from Beaver to Weaver, in what is known as the Weaver Bottoms, are unpaved gravel.

History
Highway 74 was authorized in 1933. The south end of Highway 74 previously extended south of Chatfield to old U.S. Highway 16 at Spring Valley until 1974. As a result of this, the present day mile markers begin at mile 20. Highway 74 follows, in part, an old route that was one of the first public roads in the Minnesota Territory.

In 1953, the route was still gravel south of U.S. Highway 14. Highway 74 was paved by 1960, except for the northernmost .

Flood
The 2007 Midwest flooding caused much damage to Highway 74. On August 18 and 19, 2007, the flooded Whitewater River destroyed bridges and washed out the roadway in several places. By 2008, repairs were complete.

Images

Major intersections

References

074
Transportation in Fillmore County, Minnesota
Transportation in Olmsted County, Minnesota
Transportation in Winona County, Minnesota
Transportation in Wabasha County, Minnesota